Atomic Winter is the Swedish heavy metal band Destiny's second studio album. It was released in September 1988 on both vinyl and CD.

The album contains a re-recording of the song "Spellbreaker" from the previous album Beyond All Sense. The album cover was painted by Derek Riggs, of Iron Maiden fame.

Reception

The album plunged into obscurity, despite positive responses from reviewers. "I won't waste space with their history, since I need all the space to praise them", a fanzine reviewer wrote. Paul Miller of Kerrang! claimed that "Quality of this sort his hard to find" and gave Atomic Winter KKKK½. Domestic reviews were also favourable: "Without doubt one of the most interesting bands" was Tore Lund's verdict on the tabloid GT , whereas Fia Persson of Expressen found the album to be "surprisingly fast and good".

Track listing
"Bermuda" (Floyd Konstantin, Zenny Gram, Jörgen Pettersson) - 4:15
"Who Am I" (Konstantin, Gram) - 3:40
"Spellbreaker" (Magnus Österman) - 3:55
"Beware" (Konstantin, Gram, Pettersson) - 4:49
"Religion" (Stefan Björnshög, Gram, Pettersson) - 5:25
"The Extreme Unction" (Petterson, Håkan Ring) - 2:48
"Dark Heroes" (Gram, Pettersson) - 6:38
"Living Dead" (Björnshög, Gram) - 3:20 
"Atomic Winter" (Konstantin, Gram) - 8:09

Personnel

Band members
Zenny Gram (formerly Hansson) - lead and backing vocals
Stefan Björnshög - bass, backing vocals
Floyd Konstantin - guitar
Jörgen Pettersson - guitar
Peter Lundgren - drums

Additional musicians
Henryk Lipp - keyboards 
Pär Edwardsson, Thomas Eriksson - backing vocals

References

1988 albums
Destiny (band) albums